Stacey Morris is an American barber and hairdresser. She was nominated for an Academy Award in the category Best Makeup and Hairstyling for the film Coming 2 America. Morris was also nominated for six Primetime Emmy Awards, one Critics Choice Award, seven MUAHS Awards with two wins, in the category Outstanding Hairstyling. Stacey has worked as a stylist on 87 notable productions, starting on classic TV shows like Martin and The Fresh Prince of Bel-Air. The styles executed in Dolemite Is My Name currently appear on exhibit at the Academy Museum of Motion Pictures in Los Angeles, California.

Morris served as a personal barber-stylist for Eddie Murphy, Anthony Anderson, Lil Nas X, and Alfonso Ribiero.

Selected filmography 
 Coming 2 America (2021; co-nominated with Mike Marino and Carla Farmer)

References

External links 

Living people
Year of birth missing (living people)
Place of birth missing (living people)
American make-up artists
American hairdressers
Barbers
21st-century African-American women